José Marcelo Salas Melinao (born 24 December 1974), nicknamed Matador (due to his goalscoring celebrations), El Fenómeno and Shileno, is a Chilean former footballer who played as a striker. Salas is considered the best striker in the history of Chile. He stood out during the 1990s and 2000s in clubs such as Universidad de Chile, River Plate, Lazio and Juventus. He was captain of the Chile national team and the top scorer – scoring 45 goals in total: 37 goals for the Chile national football team (4 in World Cups, 18 in World Cup qualification processes and 15 in friendlies) and 8 goals with the Chile Olympic football team.

He played in Chile, Argentina and Italy, winning titles with each club he joined.

The IFFHS ranked him as the 31st best South American player of the 20th century, the 19th best South American forward of the 20th century and the 3rd best South American forward of the 1990s (integrating the podium with Brazilians players Ronaldo and Romário). In 1997 he ranked 3rd as the "best centre forward in the world" (after players Ronaldo and Gabriel Batistuta) and he was ranked 5th in the “Best Centre Forward” category in the RSS Award for the best footballer of the year, in 1998 and 1999. He was also named the South American Footballer of the Year in 1997.

A powerful and tenacious forward, with good technique, who was well-known for his deft touch with his left foot, as well as his aerial ability, Salas had a prolific goalscoring record throughout his career. Between 1996 and 2001 he was considered one of the best forwards in the world, often compared to Ronaldo and Gabriel Batistuta.

Salas is considered one of the greatest players in the history of Universidad de Chile, an icon for the football team River Plate of Argentina, and one of the greatest foreign players in Lazio's history. He played for the Chile national football team at the 1998 FIFA World Cup in France, where he scored four goals in four matches, leading his team to the second round of the competition. Additionally, Salas played for the Chile national football team at two Copa América tournaments, helping his team to reach fourth place in the 1999 edition of the tournament.

Club career

Universidad de Chile
Born in Temuco, Salas played for the Deportes Temuco youth team until his father took him to Santiago de Chile to be incorporated into the Universidad de Chile team.

Salas joined the Universidad de Chile team in 1993 and debuted on 4 January 1994 in a match against Cobreloa where he scored a goal. Finally, Salas was consolidated in the match against Colo Colo at the National Stadium, where he scored a Hat-trick in the 4–1 victory. His great performances quickly led the university fans to give him the nickname of "Matador" due to his cold blood when defining, also inspired by the song of the same name by the Argentine musical group Los Fabulosos Cadillacs, which at that time was fashionable in Latin America. It was also at this time that he patented his particular way of celebrating goals: he put one leg down, bowed his head, stretched his right arm and pointed his index finger towards the sky.

Salas helped the team win back-to-back titles in 1994 and 1995, he was an essential player for the Universidad de Chile team, as the was the top scorer in both seasons (27 goals in the first season and 17 goals in the second season). Leaving a trail of 76 goals which included a strong 1996 campaign in the Copa Libertadores.

River Plate
Later in 1996, Salas moved to Argentina to play in River Plate team of the Argentine first division of football. On 30 September 1996 he scored his first goal, in a match played against Boca Juniors at the La Bombonera stadium. From 1996 to 1998 Salas scored 31 goals in 67 games, helping River to win the Torneo de Apertura 1996 (where he scored two goals in the 3–0 win over Vélez Sarsfield that made him champion), the Clausura 1997, the Apertura 1997 (scoring the title goal against Argentinos Juniors), and the 1997 Supercopa Libertadores, where he scored the 2 goals in the final against São Paulo that gave the millionaire club the cup. In addition, he was elected the Best Footballer of the season in Argentina and South American Footballer of the Year in 1997. These accomplishments would cement his legacy in Argentina as one of its greatest foreign born players earning the nickname, "El shileno (sic) Salas".

The Argentine team valued his transfer at US$30,000,000 as the English football club Manchester United (The coach Alex Ferguson wanted a player with the characteristics of Ronaldo and Marcelo Salas to replace the retirement of Eric Cantona, Ferguson traveled 14,000 miles to sign Salas, but River Plate refused to sell him.), in addition to great clubs from Italy and Spain for hiring him.

Lazio
On 1 February 1998, thanks to his good performances both in Argentina and in the Chile national football team, he was sold to S.S. Lazio in Italy for US$20.5 million. becoming the highest transfer in history at that time, after Ronaldo, Rivaldo and Denilson (to Inter Milan from Italy, Barcelona and Betis from Spain, respectively).

Salas played in Italy for five years: three years with S.S. Lazio (1998–2001), a key catalyst in helping turn around a Lazio team that hadn't won a Scudetto since the 1973–1974 season. He made his debut for Lazio on 12 August 1998 against the UEFA Champions League champion, the Real Madrid of Spain, where he scored the second goal of his team, in the Teresa Herrera Trophy. His official debut was for the Supercoppa italiana where his team won the competition after winning 2–1 over Juventus F.C., on 29 August 1998. With Salas in the team, successes in Italian football returned for the whole of the Italian capital, after 25 years. He scored his first goal for Serie A playing for Lazio a few days later against Inter Milan. With Lazio he won a Serie A (being Salas the team's top scorer with 12 annotations), an Coppa Italia, two Supercoppa Italiana, a UEFA Cup Winners' Cup and a UEFA Super Cup, scoring the match's only goal in the latter, in a 1–0 win over Manchester United.

Salas quickly became an idol of the Lazio tifosi, where they dedicated songs to him, the most traditional was: "Matador, Matador, che ce frega de Ronaldo noi c'avemo er Matador" (Matador, Matador, we care about Ronaldo if we have the Matador).

After rejecting offers of US$30,000,000 from important football club as: Manchester United, Chelsea, Arsenal, Liverpool, Barcelona, Parma, A.C. Milan and Inter Milan. was in negotiations with Real Madrid to become, together with Zinedine Zidane, one of the two great "meringues" signings of 2001. However, the transfer failed, largely due to the exorbitant sum that the Spanish club had invested in the signing of Zidane. Finally, that same year he signed for Juventus, after paying the club €25,000,000 (US$28,500,000) for him, which at the time was the most expensive transfer of a Chilean player.

Juventus
In 2001, he was transferred to Juventus F.C. for 55 billion lire (€28.5 million by fixed exchange rate; 22 billion lire cash plus Darko Kovačević) his stay in Turin was cut short due to a torn ACL in his right knee against Bologna FC in a match valid for Serie A. Where Salas would endure the worst moments of his career; he was hampered by injuries, including a further issue with his knee meniscus, allowing him to participate in only 26 games and scoring just 4 goals.

Return to River Plate 
After Juventus unsuccessfully tried to transfer him to such high-profile European clubs as Manchester United, Chelsea, Liverpool, Barcelona, A.C. Milan, and Sporting Lisbon (in exchange for the transfer of a young Cristiano Ronaldo), in 2003 he was loaned back to River Plate.

Hailed as "Saint Matador" by fans, Salas stood out especially in that year's Copa Sudamericana, but could not prevent his team's defeat in the final against Cienciano of Peru, despite scoring the tying goal 3–3 in the first leg. However, he later achieved a new title: the 2004 Clausura.

A year later, he helped River Plate reach the semifinals of the 2005 Copa Libertadores, scoring a hat-trick against Liga de Quito. In his second stay at River Plate, Salas scored 17 goals in 43 games.

Marcelo Salas is regarded as one of the greatest players in the history of River Plate, along with Ángel Labruna, Enzo Francescoli, Ramón Díaz, Norberto Alonso, Ubaldo Fillol and Amadeo Carrizo. In addition, he was one of the few foreign players who have worn the Millonarios captain armband.

Universidad de Chile
Between 2004 and 2005 he received offers to return to European football from Barcelona in Spain and Inter Milan in Italy, among others.

In late July 2005, it was confirmed that he would return to his original football team, Universidad de Chile on a temporary deal from Juventus team.

Salas announced his retirement on 28 November 2008, at the age of 33. Before the 23 November game where the Universidad de Chile beat Cobreloa 3–2, with two goals from Salas at the National Stadium.

Retirement
Salas played his last game on 2 June 2009. Amongst the invited players were his friends from the 1993–1996 Universidad de Chile squads, River Plate, Juventus, plus members of Chile's France '98 World Cup squad. More than 60,000 people attended to pay him one final salute. Playing for both sides, he managed to score three goals.

International career
Salas represented Chile at under-20 level in 1993 alongside players such as Francisco Rojas, Claudio Lizama and Claudio Villan.

On 30 April 1994 at the National Stadium, Salas made his debut for the Chile national football team at age 19, scoring his first international goal in a 3–3 draw with Argentina of Diego Maradona, who was preparing for the World Cup 1994.

In 1995 his team won the Canada Cup, where Salas scored the "goal of the victory" in the final match against Canada (2–1).

During the 1998 World Cup qualification campaign, Salas scored 11 goals. He also scored memorable goals: against Argentina of local, in Quito of visit against Ecuador and of local against Uruguay, including hat-tricks against Colombia and Peru, and a goal in the final match against Bolivia. Against Peru, he became the youngest Chilean footballer to wear the captain's belt, at just 22 years old.

During the training for the 1998 FIFA World Cup in France, Chile played a friendly match with England in front of about 65,000 people at the legendary Wembley Stadium on 11 February 1998. In a memorable match, Chile won 2–0 with goals of "The Killer". The first, of great invoice, with perfect control, spin and definition, without letting the ball touch the ground after a pass of more than 60 meters. The second, a penalty that he created after brilliantly dribbling the English defender Sol Campbell.

In 1998, Marcelo Salas had an outstanding performance in the 1998 FIFA World Cup, reaching the 16th round of the tournament. He scored 4 goals: two against Italy, one against Austria and one against Brazil positioning himself as the third-best scorer of the World Cup in that year, along with Brazilian striker Ronaldo, being only 1 away from the bronze boot, and 2 from the golden boot.

In 1999, Chile national football team reached the semi-finals of the Copa América, where they won fourth place.

On 15 August 2000, Salas was the great figure in Chile 3–0 victory over Brazil, scoring a great goal and being the most important player of the match, played in the 2002 World Cup qualification.

Due to his injury problems, Salas's appearances for Chile were limited after 2001. He scored four goals in nine matches during the failed 2002 World Cup qualification campaign and during the 2006 World Cup qualification. He surpassed his attacking partner Iván Zamorano as the nation's all-time leading scorer for the second time (he had previously done so in 1998) with his 35th goal against Bolivia.

On 18 November 2007, during a match for the qualification for 2010 World Cup where Chile played against Uruguay, Marcelo Salas scored his last 2 final goals at the majestic Estadio Centenario, the first with a header after Carlos Villanueva center and the second, penalty.

Career statistics
Club

International

Score and Result lists Chile's goals first

Personal life
He is the nephew-in-law of the former Chile international footballer  since his wife, Carolina Messen, is the niece of him.

His maternal surname, Melinao, means "four lions" in Mapudungun.

Honours

ClubUniversidad de ChilePrimera División de Chile: 1994, 1995River PlateArgentine Primera División: 1996 Apertura, 1997 Clausura, 1997 Apertura, 2004 Clausura
Supercopa Libertadores: 1997LazioSerie A: 1999–2000
Coppa Italia: 1999–2000
Supercoppa Italiana: 1998
UEFA Cup Winners' Cup: 1998–99
UEFA Super Cup: 1999JuventusSerie A: 2001–02, 2002–03
Supercoppa Italiana: 2002

Individual
 Top scorer Copa Chile: 1994
 America's Ideal Team: 1996, 1997
South American Footballer of the Year: 1997
Argentine Footballer of the Year: 1997
Olimpia Award: 1997
Award for the best athlete in Chile: 1997
3rd "Best Centre Forward in the World" RSS Award for the best footballer of the year: 1997
Chilean Footballer of the Year: 1997, 1998
Third scorer (shared) 1998 FIFA World Cup
Included within the 10 figures of 1998 FIFA World Cup
5th “Best Centre Forward in the World” RSS Award for the best footballer of the year: 1998
Integra the Rest of the world in sports and games 1998
Goal scorer 1999 UEFA Super Cup
5th “Best Centre Forward in the World” RSS Award for the best footballer of the year: 1999
Best South American striker of the 1990s by IFFHS: No. 3
Best South American striker of the 20th century by IFFHS: No. 19
Best South American player of the 20th century by IFFHS: No. 31
Order of the Liberator General San Martín: 2009
Included in the Top 10 Best Scorers in the History of South American Soccer
7th best South American left-foot soccer player in history ("Bleacher Report" magazine)
4th best striker in the history of South America of the 1990s
Included in the best 50 soccer players in history representative of each country by These Football Times (The Guardian)
Included in the 50 Greatest South American Footballers of All Time: #27

 Tributes 

In the year 2004 the River Plate club of Argentina honored and immortalized the figure of Marcelo Salas with a portrait of the image of the "Matador" in the dressing rooms of the Monumental de Nuñez Stadium, being included among the most prominent idols in the club's history. Also in the year 2009, at the inauguration of the museum of the Argentine club, the goals of Marcelo Salas are portrayed in videos and images (the goals of the titles of the Apertura 1996, Clausura 1997, Apertura 1997, Supercopa Sudamericana 1997, among others), in addition to the shirts and boots that Marcelo Salas wore while he played in River Plate.

In the year 2013 Marcelo Salas received a tribute from the English Football Federation at Wembley Stadium for his "excellent performance" in the England vs Chile match from 11 February from 1998. Where his first goal of that match is portrayed in the museum of said stadium, as one of the best goals in all history scored at Wembley Stadium.

 Players tribute 

Long is the list of public figures whose idol is the "Matador" where several of them have decided to honor Marcelo Salas by imitating his typical celebration after scoring a goal: knee to the ground, head bowed and one arm pointing to the sky. Among the players who have Salas as an idol, the following stand out:Football players  Alexis Sánchez
  Arturo Vidal
  Charles Aránguiz
  David Pizarro
  David Trezeguet
  Eduardo Vargas
  Gastón Fernández
  Gonzalo Higuaín
  Humberto Suazo
  Javier Saviola
  José Luis Villanueva
  Marcelo Díaz
  Marcelo Larrondo
  Mauricio Isla
  Pablo Aimar
  Radamel Falcao
  Santiago Solari
  Carla Guerrero
  Christiane Endler
  Camila PavezGolfer  Nicole PerrotTennis players'

  Guillermo Coria
  Facundo Bagnis
  Federico Coria
  Felipe Arevalo

Tributes from the world of music 

On 16 October 1997, Jay Kay, lead singer of the English band Jamiroquai, paid tribute to Marcelo Salas, in his presentation with the band at the Teatro Caupolicán, wearing the traditional shirt number 11 from Salas where he celebrated as the Matador on stage

On 11 February 1998 the Irish band U2 performed in Chile for the first time. That day the vocalist and leader Bono went on stage at the National Stadium along with the rest of the members wearing Marcelo Salas' jersey number 11, where at the same time Salas' goals playing for Chile against England at Wembley Stadium were displayed on a giant screen.

References

External links
  
 International Career
 
 
 
 1st in South America Player of the Year 1997
 7th in South America Player of the Year 1996
 8th in the World Player of the Year Award 1997
 14th in the World Player of the Year Award 1998
 Argentina Player of the Year 1997
 Bronze Boot Award in the World Cup 1998
 31st in IFFHS South American Player of the Century

1974 births
Living people
Chilean people of Mapuche descent
Mapuche sportspeople
People from Temuco
Chilean footballers
Chilean expatriate footballers
Chile international footballers
Chile under-20 international footballers
Universidad de Chile footballers
Club Atlético River Plate footballers
S.S. Lazio players
Juventus F.C. players
Chilean Primera División players
Argentine Primera División players
Serie A players
Chilean expatriate sportspeople in Argentina
Chilean expatriate sportspeople in Italy
Expatriate footballers in Argentina
Expatriate footballers in Italy
1998 FIFA World Cup players
1995 Copa América players
1999 Copa América players
South American Footballer of the Year winners
Indigenous sportspeople of the Americas
20th-century Mapuche people
21st-century Mapuche people
Association football forwards